Bacchylus was a second  century Bishop of Corinth who was known for supporting Papal claims,  and writings on the passover.

References

2nd-century bishops in the Roman Empire
Bishops of Corinth